VM 2000 is a hypervisor from Fujitsu (formerly Siemens Nixdorf Informationssysteme) designed specifically for use with the BS2000 operating system.  It is an EBCDIC-based operating system. It allows multiple images of BS2000 and Linux to operate on a S-series computer, which is based on the IBM System/390 architecture. It also supports BS2000, Linux and Microsoft Windows on x86-based SQ-series mainframes. Additionally, it can virtualize BS2000 guests on SR- and SX-series mainframes, based on MIPS and SPARC respectively.

See also
Paravirtualization

References

External links
 Virtualization VM2000

Virtualization software
MIPS operating systems